Amphorina andra is a species of sea slug or nudibranch, a marine gastropod mollusc in the family Eubranchidae.

Distribution
This species was described from Smögen, outermost skerries, Sweden, NE Atlantic. Additional specimens from the UK, Italy and Croatia indicate that it has a wide distribution from Sweden to the Mediterranean Sea.

References

Eubranchidae
Gastropods described in 2020